The Real Football Fan Show is a British football television talk show that first aired on Channel 4 in 2018. It is presented by Robbie Lyle, the founder of AFTV. The show features association football fans discussing various topics regarding the Premier League, the highest level of the English football league system.

Transmissions

References

External links
 
 
 

2018 British television series debuts
2019 British television series endings
2010s British television talk shows
Channel 4 talk shows
English-language television shows